Summer of '62 is a 2007 French film, filmed in Algeria and directed by Mehdi Charef. It was screened out of competition at the 2007 Cannes Film Festival.

Plot
The plot concerns the final stages of the Algerian War of Independence in the summer if 1962, as seen through the eyes of Ali, the 11-year-old son of an FLN moudjahid, his mother and his French and Arab friends, as they experience the massive social changes of the end of French rule. The ensemble cast consists mostly of amateur actors.

Cast
Hamada - Ali
Zahia Said - Aïcha
Thomas Millet - Nico
Tolga Cayir - Gino
Julien Amate - David
Nassim Meziane	- Paul
Aurore Labrugère - Julie
Nadia Samir - Habiba
Bonnafet Tarbouriech - Barnabé (Station Chief)
Mohamed Dine Elhannani	- Djelloul
Betty Krestinsky - Rachel
Assia Brahmi - Zina
Marc Robert - Lt. Laurent

References

External links
 

2007 films
2007 drama films
French drama films
Films directed by Mehdi Charef
2000s French films